Roy Wright may refer to:

 Roy V. Wright (1876–1948), member of the New Jersey State Senate
 Roy Wright (physiologist) (1907–1990), Australian physiologist
 Roy Wright (c. 1919–1959), one of the Scottsboro Boys
 Roy Wright (footballer) (1929–2002), Australian football player
 Roy Wright (baseball) (1933–2018), American baseball pitcher
 Roy Wright (journalist), British editor The Daily Express in the 1970s